Constance Steinkuehler (Squire) is an American professor of Informatics at the University of California–Irvine. She previously taught at the University of Wisconsin-Madison before taking public service leave, from 2011-2012, to work as a Senior Policy Analyst in the Office of Science and Technology Policy (OSTP) at the White House Executive Office, where she advised on policy matters about video games and learning.
 She currently researches cognitive and social aspects of video games and gaming at the University of California, Irvine. Her current projects include mixed methods research on the North American Scholastic Esports Federation (NASEF) high school esports league, quantitative study of esports in higher education, and advice on parenting gamers. She is currently a co-chair of the Connected Learning Summit (CLL), and chair for  the annual Esports Conference (ESC) at UCI as well as the UCI Esports Program Task Force for Diversity and Inclusion. She has published over ninety articles and book chapters including three special journal issues and two books.

Education 
Steinkuehler graduated from the University of Missouri in Columbia, Missouri, with three bachelor's degrees (mathematics, English, and religious studies) in 1993. She earned a master of science degree in educational psychology with a focus on cognitive science in 2000 from the University of Wisconsin-Madison. In 2005 she received her Ph.D. in Curriculum and Instruction studies, also from the University of Wisconsin-Madison. Her doctoral thesis focus was "Cognition & Learning in Massively Multiplayer Online Games".

Professional career

Research 
After earning her doctorate, she joined the faculty at University of Wisconsin as an associate professor of digital media and taught classes on "videogames, research methods, and the 'smart' side of intellectual side of video games in Curriculum and Instruction Department.

From 2005 to 2013, Steinkuehler ran a research lab with doctoral and undergraduate students, which investigated forms of cognition and cultural practices as they relate to gameplay and learning. The group focused largely on online game communities and fandoms. They took a sociocultural approach to their research, using mixed methods, including ethnographic work and experimental research.

From 2007 to 2009, Steinkuehler ran a casual learning lab for at-risk adolescent boys, largely from rural areas, who were considered to be disengaging from or failing school. Her lab experiments focused on comparing gaming and school contexts to leverage the boys' interest in games toward productive literacy practices. The lab investigated the nature, function, and quality of texts that are a regular part of online gaming, how reading performance of adolescents on such game-related texts compares to performance on school-related texts, as well as the factors that contribute to such differences (e.g., prior knowledge, strategy, persistence, choice), and how game-related reading activities are situated within (or against) children's everyday literacy networks across contexts, including both school and home.

Steinkuehler explored the educational merit of games designed for and played by youth instead of adults (which is typically studied) from 2009 to 2011. The goal was to examine how games are situated in the daily life of a young adult. The research included a cognitive ethnography of Runescape, which at the time, was the most popular online game for children ages 10 to 16. Additional research included assessing what youth learn through online gameplay and how that learning aligns and/or conflicts with current educational standards.

Currently, Steinkuehler is the faculty lead for the UCI Esports Research Lab; which examines esports players and fans to assess the cognitive, social, and behavioral aspects of competitive video game play and community participation.  The lab approaches research with an open mind to various methods and currently deploys tactics that range from game analytics and quantitative surveys to field observations and conversation analysis. Steinkuehler and her lab work closely with the UCI Esports Team as well as NASEF. Additionally, her lab is a part of the larger Connected Learning Lab at UCI.

Steinkuehler's research has been funded by the Samueli Foundation, the MacArthur Foundation, the Gates Foundation, the National Academy of Education/Spencer Foundation, the National Science Foundation, and Cambridge University. Furthermore, she has worked closely with the National Academy of Sciences and National Academy of Education on special reports relate to videogames, and her work has been featured in Science, Wired, USA Today, New York Times, LA Times, ABC, CBS, CNN NPR, BBC and The Chronicle of Higher Education.

Public Service 
In 2009, she served on the National Academy of Sciences Committee on Games.

Additionally, Steinkuehler is the founder and former President of the Higher Education Video Games Alliance (2014 to 2017), an academic organization of game-related programs in higher education.

Steinkuehler is a founding fellow of the Games+Learning+Society (GLS) and chaired, from 2012 to 2017, the annual Games, Learning & Society Conference held each summer in Madison, Wisconsin.

From 2011 to 2012 she took public service leave and worked as a Senior Policy Analyst in the Office of Science and Technology Policy (OSTP) at the White House Executive Office to advise federal agencies and private foundations on ways to develop games that have positive social impact. Specifically, she helped coordinate cross-agency efforts to leverage games toward national priority areas including childhood obesity, early literacy, and STEM education, and helped forge new partnerships to support an ecosystem of innovation. This work led to the creation of the Federal Games Guild. Furthermore, she played a key role in meetings through the Vice President's office on the controversial debate over violent video games.

She currently serves on the advisory board for the UCI Esports Program and Chairs the UCI Diversity and Inclusion in Esports Task Force.

Personal life 
Steinkuehler is married to Kurt Squire, former Creative Director at the Wisconsin Institutes for Discovery, and also a professor at University of California–Irvine.

She appeared in a pilot TV show called Brain Trust. The show was piloted in 2008 and featured a team of thought leaders working collaboratively to solve seemingly unsolvable problems.

Select Publications 
Steinkuehler is an author or editor on four different books and has contributed chapters to eight other book titles. Additionally, she has published more than 20 articles in peer-reviewed journals in areas ranging from cognition to education to technology.

Some selected works can be found below:
Steinkuehler, C. & Duncan, S. (2007). Scientific habits of mind in virtual worlds. Paper presented at the Annual Meeting of the American Association for the Advancement of Science (AAAS), San Francisco, February 15–19.
Steinkuehler, C. & Williams, D. (2006). "Where everybody knows your (screen) name: Online games as 'third places'". Journal of Computer-Mediated Communication, 11(4).
Steinkuehler, C. A. (2004). Learning in massively multiplayer online games. In Y. B. Kafai, W. A. Sandoval, N. Enyedy, A. S. Nixon, & F. Herrera (Eds.), Proceedings of the Sixth International Conference of the Learning Sciences (pp. 521–528). Mahwah, NJ: Erlbaum.

References

External links 

 UC Irvine Informatics - faculty profile for Steinkuehler
 GLS Conference website
 Fox News
 New York Times
MacArthur Foundation article on NPR appearance
Wired
WoW Insider

Writers from Madison, Wisconsin
University of Missouri alumni
 University of Wisconsin–Madison School of Education alumni
University of Wisconsin–Madison faculty
Living people
University of California, Irvine faculty
Year of birth missing (living people)